Henry Hunter Bryan (February 23, 1786 – May 7, 1835) was an American politician who represented Tennessee in the United States House of Representatives.

Biography
Bryan was born in Martin County, North Carolina and attended grammar and high school there. After he moved to Tennessee, he held several local offices. He married Elizabeth Ann Averett, daughter of Jesse Averett and Mary Grimes, in 1804.

Career
Bryan was elected as a Democratic-Republican to the Sixteenth Congress, which lasted from March 4, 1819 to March 3, 1821.  Although he had been re-elected to the Seventeenth Congress, he did not take the seat because he did not qualify.

Death
Bryan was a member of the Freemasons. He died in Montgomery County, Tennessee, on May 7, 1835 (age 49 years, 73 days). The location of his interment is unknown.  His brother, Joseph Hunter Bryan, was also a U.S. Representative from the state of North Carolina.

References

External links

1786 births
1835 deaths
Democratic-Republican Party members of the United States House of Representatives from Tennessee
19th-century American politicians
People from Martin County, North Carolina
People from Montgomery County, Tennessee